The reconstruction of London is an Act of the Parliament of England (19 Cha. 2. c. 8) with the long title "An Act for rebuilding the City of London." The Act was passed in February 1667 in the aftermath of the Great Fire of London and drawn up by Sir Matthew Hale. An earlier Act, the Fire of London Disputes Act 1666, had set up a court to settle disputes arising from buildings destroyed by the Fire. This Act regulated the rebuilding, authorized the City of London Corporation to reopen and widen roads, designated the anniversary of the Fire a feast day, and authorized the building of the Monument. A duty of one shilling on a chaldron (at the time approximately 2,670 kg) of coal was imposed to pay for these measures.

Building regulations

Within a few days of the Fire, several proposals for restructuring the city had been put forward by various leading citizens, including Christopher Wren, Robert Hooke, and John Evelyn. Most of the suggested plans involved restructuring the medieval city's roads into a grid pattern, and were rejected on the grounds that re-parceling all the land would have been too difficult, time-intensive, and costly. Keeping Londoners in the city and salvaging its economy were top priorities, and thus the Act focused on putting straightforward, common-sense building regulations into place as soon as possible. In order to prevent improper construction by over-eager Londoners, the Act included a provision to demolish any new buildings that had been erected without adhering to the Act's regulations. Measures were included to attract workmen to the city, and to prevent price gouging of materials or labour.

Among other things, the Act added or modified regulations to:

 Architectural styles of buildings on designated High Streets
 Heights of private homes
 Building materials (brick and stone preferred)
 Wall thicknesses
 Street widths
 Buildings within 40 feet of the Thames
 Jetties and similar overhangs (banned)

The overall effect was meant to be “harmonious and orderly, [but] without excessive standardization.”

Between 1667 and 1670, the coal tax only raised £23,000 of the expected £100,000; the duty was later increased to 3 shillings in the Rebuilding of London Act of 1670 in order to raise enough money to fund the rebuilding the city's churches, including St. Paul's Cathedral.

See also
Rebuilding of London Act 1670
Great Fire of London

References

External links
Image of the Act on the UK Parliament website

1666 in law
Acts of the Parliament of England
17th century in London
1666 in England
History of the City of London
Great Fire of London
Law in London